This was the first edition of the tournament.

Federico Coria won the title after defeating Jaume Munar 7–5, 6–3 in the final.

Seeds

Draw

Finals

Top half

Bottom half

References

External links
Main draw
Qualifying draw

Aberto da República - 1